Szomolya is a village in Borsod-Abaúj-Zemplén county, Hungary.

Gallery

External links 
 Street map 
 Aerial photographs of Szomolya

Populated places in Borsod-Abaúj-Zemplén County